Carlos Uzabeaga (5 December 1907 – 17 February 1964) was a Chilean boxer. He competed in the men's bantamweight event at the 1924 Summer Olympics.

References

External links
 

1907 births
1964 deaths
Chilean male boxers
Olympic boxers of Chile
Boxers at the 1924 Summer Olympics
Bantamweight boxers
20th-century Chilean people